This list of giant squid specimens and sightings from the 21st century is a comprehensive timeline of recent human encounters with members of the genus Architeuthis, popularly known as giant squid. It includes animals that were caught by fishermen, found washed ashore, recovered (in whole or in part) from sperm whales and other predatory species, as well as those reliably sighted at sea. The list also covers specimens incorrectly assigned to the genus Architeuthis in original descriptions or later publications.

Background 

The beginning of the 21st century marked a turning point in humanity's understanding of the life habits of the giant squid, as it ushered in the first visually documented and incontrovertible observations of live animals, both adult and paralarval. The quest to photograph or film a live giant squid—mooted since at least the 1960s—had begun in earnest in the 1980s and intensified significantly in the following decade, with several multi-million-dollar expeditions launched in the late 1990s. While these were all unsuccessful, they were followed by a steady stream of live giant squid "firsts" in the nascent years of the 21st century, and spurred further efforts that ultimately culminated in the first footage of live giant squid in their natural deep-ocean habitat—recorded off Japan's Ogasawara Islands in 2012.

The turn of the century also roughly coincided with a shift in the way new giant squid specimens were reported and information on them was disseminated. The rapidly growing popularity of the World Wide Web resulted in a proliferation of both online news sources and platforms for sharing and discussing said news, the latter facilitating a never-before-seen level of engagement between professional teuthologists and amateur enthusiasts. Consequently, much of the information on recent specimens is drawn from online rather than print sources, though scholarly papers continue to be published on individual specimens. There exists a sizeable internet community of giant squid enthusiasts, and developments in the field—particularly videos of live animals—generate considerable excitement online, a phenomenon that has been described as "giant squid mania".

Giant squid are generally considered inedible owing to the high concentration of ammonium chloride in their tissues, which renders them exceptionally bitter. However, processing methods to make them more palatable have been investigated, with drying and boiling showing some success. Beginning in the 2010s, a number of specimens have been prepared by hard curing, with some of these served for human consumption (e.g. #598, 603, and 617). Other forms of preparation have also been tried (e.g. #558, 602, 678, and 681), with occasional dubious claims of specimens being eaten raw (e.g. #83).

Quest for a live animal 

Though the total number of recorded giant squid specimens now runs into the hundreds, the species remains notoriously elusive and little known, and has retained its status as a "quasi-mythical" animal. By the turn of the 21st century, the giant squid remained one of the few truly large extant megafauna to have never been photographed alive, either in the wild or in captivity. Marine writer and artist Richard Ellis described it as "the most elusive image in natural history". Acquiring footage of the animal in its natural habitat became "the holy grail of natural history cinematography".

Early expeditions

1986–1990: Beebe Project 
Though there had been proposals since at least the 1960s, the first dedicated effort to capture a glimpse of the animal in its natural habitat was probably the Beebe Project, initiated in 1986 and named after pioneering deep-sea explorer William Beebe. Like Beebe's original dives, it was initially conducted off Bermuda, which was not known for giant squid (but see #191). In addition to finding the giant squid, the expedition's other main objective was the study of six-gill sharks of the genus Hexanchus. Financed primarily by NOAA and organised and led by National Geographic photographer Emory Kristof, the expedition involved scientists from numerous universities and scientific institutions, including shark specialist Eugenie Clark and underwater explorer Joseph B. MacInnis; wildlife artist Glen Loates, known for his naturalistic depictions of the giant squid, was also involved.

The expedition relocated to Newfoundland in 1988, at which point it was joined by giant squid expert Frederick Aldrich of the Memorial University of Newfoundland. Efforts continued until at least 1990; at one point, a "gigantic squid jig, painted bright red and outfitted with numerous hooks" was trialled, as was "hundreds of pounds" of raw tuna, but all attempts proved unsuccessful.

1993: misidentified live specimen 
A photograph purporting to show a live Architeuthis dux alongside a diver was published in the 1993 book European Seashells, but this turned out to be a sick or dying Onykia robusta (misidentification #[7]). Richard Ellis wrote: "Fortunately for those who have devoted their lives to searching for Architeuthis, this was only an aberration, a case of mistaken identity."

1996–2001: Smithsonian expeditions and increasing global interest 
After years of planning, a series of further expeditions aimed at capturing footage of a live giant squid in its natural habitat were mounted in the late 1990s, but all were unsuccessful. The three Smithsonian-backed efforts comprised a smaller-scale undertaking in the Azores in July 1996 and two major expeditions—known as "In Search of Giant Squid"—to Kaikōura Canyon off New Zealand in January–March 1997 and February–March 1999 (the former covered by National Geographic and also sponsored by the New England Aquarium, and the latter including a BBC Television unit). These expeditions—the latter two each costing around US$10 million (equivalent to $ million in )—employed a combination of sperm whale–mounted crittercams, baited "ropecams" or "drop-cams", an Odyssey IIB unmanned underwater vehicle, and the single-person submersible Deep Rover. All three were led by giant squid expert Clyde Roper, with the first two also involving marine biologist Malcolm Clarke and the last two Steve O'Shea of NIWA; additionally, National Geographic photographer Emory Kristof took part in the first Kaikoura expedition and oceanographer Gene Carl Feldman in the second. The Azores and first New Zealand expeditions were the subject of the 1998 National Geographic documentary Sea Monsters: Search for the Giant Squid; the second New Zealand expedition was the subject of the Discovery Channel's Quest for the Giant Squid, released in 2000.

Marine writer and artist Richard Ellis joined the first of the New Zealand expeditions and, in 1998, released a popular nonfiction book, The Search for the Giant Squid, further raising interest in the pursuit of a live animal. In 2000, Roper said: "I would guess at this point a half a dozen individuals or groups would like to find one." Oceanographic explorer Jean-Michel Cousteau, son of Jacques-Yves Cousteau, led another unsuccessful expedition to New Zealand that ended in early 2001.

21st century breakthroughs

2001–2002: first videos of live paralarvae and first photographs of live adults 

The expedition involved the NIWA research vessels RV Kaharoa and RV Tangaroa, and the New Zealand fishing trawler Tasman Viking. Seven live individuals were retrieved in 12 days from some 100 tows. However, attempts by aquaculturist Mike Tait to simulate their natural conditions in a tank proved unsuccessful and all the paralarvae soon died. The expedition was the subject of the Discovery Channel documentary Chasing Giants: On the Trail of the Giant Squid, first aired in 2002.

This milestone was followed by the first images of a live adult giant squid (at the surface) on 15 January 2002, near Goshiki beach in Amino-cho, Kyoto Prefecture, Japan (#464). It was captured and tied to a quay, where it died overnight. These images were joined by a number of little-publicised photographs of live adults at the surface off Okinawa (#472, 473, and 488).

Renewed interest in filming a live giant squid followed the 2001 recording of an enormous specimen of bigfin squid (likely of the family Magnapinnidae) at great depth off Hawaii, which received global media attention, and the observation of a possible giant squid egg mass in early 2002 (later determined to be that of Nototodarus gouldi—misidentification #[9]). This was followed by further efforts by O'Shea to capture live paralarval specimens.

2002–2003: Proyecto Kraken and other unsuccessful attempts 
Another unsuccessful attempt to film a live adult in the wild, dubbed Proyecto Kraken ("Project Kraken"), was made off the Spanish coast of Asturias in September 2002 (with a preliminary expedition in October 2001). This attempt was led by giant squid expert Ángel Guerra and involved the expedition ships Científico and Investigador and the Spanish Navy patrol ship Mouro (P-24). It initially employed a trio of autonomous underwater camera rigs connected to buoys at the surface, with adjustable visible and infrared lights and a combination of acoustic and optical lures. Though unsuccessful in filming a live giant squid, Proyecto Kraken yielded a single well-preserved male specimen by trawl (#469). The expedition was the subject of the 2003 documentary film Proyecto Kraken: En Busca del Calamar Gigante, released in English as Kraken Project: In Search of the Giant Squid. A follow-up expedition off Asturias was planned for September 2006. Later efforts were suspended due to the Spanish financial crisis.

Amid growing competition between researchers, in 2003 it was reported that O'Shea was leading a team that planned to image a live giant squid by suspending cameras in the water column that would release "puréed" female gonads to attract a male or else to release extracts from the gonads of both sexes from a remotely operated underwater vehicle at around 600 m depth. The first trial of this latter approach was planned for July 2004. A number of unsuccessful attempts were also made to film a live giant squid off South Korea.

2004: first photographs of live animal in natural habitat 
It was only on 30 September 2004 that a live giant squid was photographed in its natural deep-water habitat, off the Ogasawara Islands, by Tsunemi Kubodera and Kyoichi Mori (#492), the culmination of an effort that spanned three years and 26 week-long expeditions. The system consisted of a downward-facing camera with a light and data logger, below which extended a weighted  fishing line containing three items of bait at intervals along its length: a large hook with a Japanese flying squid (Todarodes pacificus) of  mantle length, a mesh bag containing euphausids (krill) to act as an odour lure, and finally a second bait squid directly attached to a weighted squid jig. The camera was configured to take one image every 30 seconds.

Over the next 4 hours and 13 minutes it periodically came into camera view as it struggled to free itself, gradually pulling the camera system up to a depth of around  before apparently tiring and slowly sinking to almost , at which point it severed its own tentacle and escaped. The tentacle was recovered and used to confirm the squid's taxonomic identity via DNA sequencing. The images provided a unique insight into the feeding habits of the giant squid and suggested that it was a far more active predator than had previously been thought; the findings were published in the 22 December 2005 issue of Proceedings of the Royal Society B: Biological Sciences. They were the subject of the 2006 Discovery Channel documentary Giant Squid: Caught on Camera.

2006–2012: first video of live adult and subsequent efforts 
Kubodera and his team, again working off the Ogasawara Islands, subsequently became the first to film a live adult giant squid on 4 December 2006 (#508). The animal was caught on a baited hook at  depth and pulled to the surface, where it was recorded waving its arms and ejecting large volumes of water from its funnel. It was then brought aboard the research vessel, dying in the process. Notably, footage of the squid at the surface showed the animal exhibiting conspicuous countershading, being reddish dorsally and silvery-white ventrally. The observed forceful ejection of water from the funnel provided further evidence for an active lifestyle and significant swimming ability in this species.

However, the quest to film a live giant squid in its natural habitat continued. An unsuccessful National Geographic–backed attempt off the Azores was made in 2011, headed by camera expert Martin Dohrn and assisted by Malcolm Clarke. Working from the vessel Makaira, the team used a combination of their monochrome Starlight cameras and a purpose-built Colour Starlight camera (with a film speed equivalent to 2 million ASA), which were deployed at a depth of 500 m on a custom-made stealth rig called "the Gupster" and linked to the surface by fibre-optic cable. The project was the subject of the documentary film Hunt for the Giant Squid, released the same year. Around this time, Steve O'Shea joined an expedition to the Gulf of California (Sea of Cortez) organised by a team of shark experts and anglers led by Chris Fischer that likewise aimed to film a giant squid in the wild, despite the species having never been recorded there. The team (minus O'Shea) had previously found a mutilated giant squid carcass (#540) off the Pacific coast of North America. Working from the mother ship MV Ocean, the team trialled a number of approaches, including clipping a camera onto the fin of a Humboldt squid (Dosidicus gigas; similar to the method used by the MonsterQuest team in 2006, also in the Gulf of California), attaching a piece of preserved giant squid to an ROUV arm, doing the same with a bag containing a blended giant squid ovary, using an ROUV baited with a restrained live Humboldt squid, and using a deep-water ROUV with imaging sonar. Gastric lavage (stomach pumping) of line-caught mako sharks provided no evidence of their predation on giant squid (though it confirmed that they prey on Humboldt squid), and by the end of the expedition no evidence of the giant squid's presence in the Gulf of California had been found. Though these efforts were unsuccessful, they were the subject of "The Cannibal" (or "Cannibals of Cortez") and "Giants of the Deep" (or "Squid Row"), two episodes of the National Geographic Channel series Expedition Great White (retroactively retitled Shark Men), first aired in 2011. Around the same time, researchers at the University of Aberdeen's Oceanlab also expressed an interest in filming the giant squid in its natural habitat.

2012: first videos of live animals in natural habitat 

The elusive footage was finally captured in July 2012 by a team comprising Kubodera, O'Shea and Edith Widder, after more than 285 hours underwater and 55 submersible dives. The project was a joint effort by NHK, Discovery Channel, and Japan's National Museum of Nature and Science. Early plans announced in 2010 called for the use of modified crittercams that would be attached to sperm whales using suction cups, as in the Smithsonian expeditions of the 1990s, but these were later dropped. The attempt had originally been planned for 2011 but was postponed due to the 2011 Tōhoku earthquake and tsunami. Like Kubodera's two previous "firsts", the milestone was achieved off the Ogasawara archipelago. This system employed Widder's "e-jelly", a flashing ball meant to mimic the bioluminescent signalling of a panicking Atolla jellyfish, a behaviour hypothesised to be a last-ditch effort on the part of the jellyfish to attract a predator of its predator and thereby enable its escape.

In total, five sightings of giant squid were made using this system, the last being the most impressive: the squid was recorded passing over the "e-jelly" and apparently attacking the camera system directly, lending credence to the "alarm hypothesis". About a week after the first sighting using the "Medusa" system, a live animal (#549) was filmed by a three-man crew (including Kubodera) from a Triton 3300/3 submersible (launched from OceanX's research vessel MV Alucia), providing the first ever colour and high-quality film of a live giant squid in its natural habitat. It was drawn into viewing range through a combination of a flashing squid jig and the use of a large Thysanoteuthis rhombus (diamondback squid) as bait. The giant squid was filmed feeding for about 23 minutes until it departed. The footage was the subject of two full-length documentaries that premiered in January 2013: NHK's Legends of the Deep: Giant Squid and Discovery Channel's Monster Squid: The Giant is Real. In July of the same year it appeared in a special episode of the BBC series Natural World, titled "Giant Squid: Filming The Impossible", which was adapted from the NHK documentary. O'Shea later opined that the extended submersible encounter was "[u]ndoubtedly the most-significant moment [...] Everything else pales in significance to this moment."

2013–present: live animals documented at the surface 

Since the 2012 milestone, live giant squid have been photographed and filmed at the surface on a number of occasions, mostly in Japanese waters (#564, 569, 606, 613, 614, 615, 618, 626, 630, 635, 637, 639, 644, 659, 669, 673, and 677)—the majority of these as part of the mass appearance event in the Sea of Japan between January 2014 and March 2015—but also off Spain (#648) and South Africa (#650). Additionally, two freshly stranded animals were photographed alive on South African beaches (#557 and 674), and at least four individuals were briefly kept alive in tanks in Japan (#573, 580, 587, and 632).

Notable among these encounters was a specimen (#637) seen in Toyama Bay, Japan, on 24 December 2015, the video of which is one of the highest-quality ever recorded. The squid was apparently swimming normally when a local diving shop owner dove alongside it, and after a few hours of being filmed in a harbour the animal was guided back into the open ocean. Two other specimens from Toyama Bay (#613 and 618) were similarly filmed by divers and were actually encountered slightly earlier, contrary to some claims about the former specimen being the first encounter of its type. Another noteworthy encounter was that between a paddleboarder and a badly injured individual (#650) off Melkbosstrand, South Africa, in March 2017, with the stricken animal filmed wrapping its arms around the paddleboard.

2013–present: further efforts to film live animals in natural habitat 
In August 2013, Kirsten and Joachim Jakobsen announced an Evonik Industries–backed project to film a fully intact adult giant squid in its natural habitat off the Azores and thereby determine how the species uses its long tentacles (missing in the 2012 specimen) for feeding. Efforts were ongoing as of 2015. In September 2018, it was reported that Tsunemi Kubodera was to "hunt" giant squid in Toyama Prefecture, Japan, in January–February 2019 for a documentary about his work on the species by filmmaker Shinichi Motoki.

Another video of a live giant squid in its natural deep-water habitat (#664)—reported at the time as the second ever recorded—was captured in the Gulf of Mexico at  depth in June 2019 by a NOAA-funded team that included Widder and marine biologists Nathan J. Robinson and Sönke Johnsen. The animal was seen striking an "e-jelly" lure and attached bait bag before retreating. It seemed to track the up-and-down motion of the camera rig prior to striking, indicating that giant squid are primarily visual predators that actively stalk their prey. It subsequently came to light that a seven-second clip of a live giant squid (#654)—little publicised initially—had been captured in October 2017, off the southern coast of El Hierro in the Canary Islands at around  depth, making the Gulf of Mexico video the third such recording. In 2018, environmental DNA (eDNA) sampling was used to monitor the spatiotemporal distribution of giant squid for the first time. The technique revealed the presence of giant squid in the Sea of Japan in winter but not in summer, in close agreement with historical stranding patterns.

A giant squid (#672) was again filmed in its natural habitat on 19 March 2020, this time in Bremer Bay off southwestern Australia. It was recorded from a remote camera system at a depth of around 800 m by a team once again led by Tsunemi Kubodera. The resulting footage was the first to show a giant squid using its tentacles for feeding. A short documentary released in 2021 followed another effort to film an underwater encounter between a sperm whale and a giant squid, but off the Caribbean archipelago of Guadeloupe. As in the Smithsonian expeditions of the late 1990s, it involved attaching cameras to the whales using suction cups. In one of the resulting videos, an undetermined squid limb briefly came into view, but no definitive footage of a giant squid was captured.

List of giant squid 

 Misidentification (non-architeuthid)  Record encompassing multiple specimens  Photographed or filmed while alive

Specimen images 
The following images relate to 21st century giant squid specimens and sightings. The number below each image corresponds to that given in the List of giant squid table and is linked to the relevant record therein. The date on which the specimen was first documented is also given (the little-endian day/month/year date format is used throughout).

Notes

References

Short citations

Full citations

A

B

C

D

E

F

G

H

I

J

K

L

M

N

O

P

Q

R 

  
  
 
 
  
 
 
  
 
 
 
 
 
 
 
 
 
 
  
 
 
 
 
  

Roper, I. (1999a). 18 February.
Feldman, G.C. (1999a). 19 February: First Day in New Zealand. (edited entry)
Feldman, G.C. (1999b). 20 February: Eight Arms to Hold You. (edited entry)
Feldman, G.C. (1999c). 21 February: Kebabs, Kiwiburgers and several hundred kilograms of Calamari. (edited entry)
Feldman, G.C. (1999d). 22 February: A Yellow Submarine – container. (edited entry)
Feldman, G.C. (1999e). 23 February: One Giant Squid to Go, please. (edited entry)
Feldman, G.C. (1999f). 24 February: Satellites and Squid. (edited entry)
Feldman, G.C. (1999g). 25 February: Submersible School is in Session. (edited entry)
Feldman, G.C. (1999h). 26 February: Taking the Plunge. (edited entry)
Feldman, G.C. (1999i). 27 February: Clyde Gets Immersed in his Work. (edited entry)
Feldman, G.C. (1999j). 28 February: Dragonboats, Tall Ships and the Private Lives of Giant Squid. (edited entry)
Feldman, G.C. (1999k). 1 March: At the End of Our Rope – literally. (edited entry)
Feldman, G.C. (1999l). 2 March: Getting Wrapped Up in Our Work. (edited entry)
Feldman, G.C. (1999m). 3 March: On the Road and Ocean, at Last. (edited entry)
Feldman, G.C. (1999n). 4 March: A Day in Kaikoura. (edited entry)
Feldman, G.C. (1999o). 5 March: Listening to the Whales – Part One. (edited entry)
Feldman, G.C. (1999p). 5 March: Listening to the Whales – Part Two. (edited entry)
Feldman, G.C. (1999q). 5 March: Listening to the Whales – Part Three. (edited entry)
Feldman, G.C. (1999r). 8 March: What Color is the Ocean? and why do you need satellites to tell you? (edited entry)
Roper, I. (1999b). 10 March: First Deep Dive.
Roper, C.F.E. (1999a). 11 March.
Brennan, B. (1999). 12 March.
Tracey, D. (1999). 13 March.
O'Shea, S. (1999). 14 March. 
M.V. deGruy (1999). 15 March.
Roper, I. & C.F.E. Roper (1999). 16 March.
Roper, C.F.E. (1999b). 17 March.
Roper, C.F.E. (1999c). 18 March.
[Anon.] (1999a). 19 March. 
Roper, C.F.E. (1999d). 20 March.
Roper, C.F.E. (1999e). 21 March.
Roper, C.F.E. (1999f). 22 March.
[Anon.] (1999b). 23 March. 
Roper, I. (1999c). 24 March.
Roper, C.F.E. (1999g). 25 March.
Roper, C.F.E. (1999h). 26 March: Final Dive.
Roper, C.F.E. (1999i). 27 March: Final Dispatch.

S

T

V

W

X

Y

Z

Author unknown 

 
 
 
 
 
 
  
 
  
 
 
 
  
 
 
 
  
 
 
 
  
  
  
 
 
 
  
  
  
 
 
  
 
  
 
  
 
  
 
 
 
  
 
  
 
 
 
  
  
 
 
 
  
  
 
  
  
  
 
  
 
  
  
 
 
  
 
  
 
 
 
 
 
 
 
 
  
  
 
 
 
  
 
  
  
  
  
  
  
  
  
  
  
  
 
  
  
 
 
  
  
  
  
  
  
  
 
  
 
  
  
  
 
  
 
  
  
  
  
  
  
  
  
  
  
  
  
  
  
  
  
 
 
 
 
 
 
 
  
 
  
  
 
  
 
 
 
 

Giant squid
Lists of animal specimens
21st century-related lists